Iglas is a constituency of the Uttar Pradesh Legislative Assembly covering the city of Iglas in the Aligarh district of Uttar Pradesh, India.

Iglas is one of five assembly constituencies in the Hathras Lok Sabha constituency.

Members of Legislative Assembly
1951: Sheodan Singh, Indian National Congress
1957: Kishori Raman Singh, Independent
1962: Sheodan Singh, Independent
1967: M. L. Gautam, Indian National Congress
1969: Gayatri Devi, Bharatiya Kranti Dal
1974: Rajendra Singh, Bharatiya Kranti Dal
1977: Rajendra Singh, Janata Party
1980: Pooran Chand, Indian National Congress (Indira)
1985: Rajendra Singh, Lok Dal
1989: Vijendra Singh, Indian National Congress
1991: Gyanwati Singh, Janata Dal
1993: Vijendra Singh (Toda Wale), Indian National Congress
1996: Malkhan Singh, Bhartiya Janta Party
2002: Vijendra Singh, Indian National Congress
2007: Bimlesh Singh, Rashtriya Lok Dal
2012: Triloki Ram, Rashtriya Lok Dal
2017: Rajvir Singh Diler, Bharatiya Janata Party
2017 (By-elections): Rajkumar Sahyogi, Bharatiya Janata Party
 2022: Rajkumar Sahyogi, Bharatiya Janata Party

Election results

2022

2019 Bypoll

References

External links
Official Site of Legislature in Uttar Pradesh
Uttar Pradesh Government website
UP Assembly
 

Assembly constituencies of Uttar Pradesh
Hathras district